Bryastovo may refer to the following places in Bulgaria:

Bryastovo, Dobrich Province
Bryastovo, Haskovo Province
Bryastovo, Sliven Province